Andrew Thomson (born 30 December 1972) is a former Australian rules footballer who played with the Sydney Swans in the Australian Football League (AFL).

Thomson was a rover, recruited to Sydney from Echuca. He made two appearances in the 1993 AFL season, against the Brisbane Bears in round eight and Geelong in round nine.

References

1972 births
Living people
Australian rules footballers from Victoria (Australia)
Sydney Swans players
Echuca Football Club players